The 2013 UK & Ireland Greyhound Racing Year was the 88th year of greyhound racing in the United Kingdom and Ireland.

Summary

Tracks
The GRA was subject to a management lease buyout, Wimbledon's lease was shorter than the rest of the tracks bringing the future of the track into serious question. The Oaks was switched to sister track Belle Vue meaning that Wimbledon had now lost the Laurels, Grand National and Oaks in recent years. Leading owner John Turner stepped in to save the Puppy Derby by sponsoring the event.

In Ireland, Newbridge which was leased by Morwell Racing Ltd ceased trading and left the stadium vacant. The Irish Greyhound Board stepped in to save the track and installed a management team to run it. The third BAGS/SIS track championship went to Sheffield who outpointed defending champions Newcastle in the final at Sheffield. Coventry continued to offer excellent open race prize money but suffered a blow when Racing Manager Martyn Dore left the track.

Competitions
Ballymac Eske secured victories in the Juvenile and Scottish Greyhound Derby. Charlie Lister OBE had a year to remember following a record breaking seventh English Greyhound Derby with Sidaz Jack and sixth trainers championship at Yarmouth.

Slippery Robert trained by Robert Gleeson took the Irish Derby. The William Hill Grand Prix resulted in a dead heat between Hometown Honey and Calzaghe Lilly.

Charlie Lister had four finalists in the St Leger final and his hot favourite Farloe Tango broke the track record when claiming the competition. Farloe Tango then won the Greyhound of the Year. Mark Wallis sealed a fifth trainer's title in nine years.

News
The Racing Post TV channel had a significant presence in the reporting of greyhound racing but the Greyhound Star began to consider plans to go online. Ladbrokes stepped in to sponsor the Scottish Derby which was at risk of being cancelled. Jim Woods retired after 31 years as a Racing Manager at Perry Barr, Nottingham, Leeds and Monmore.

Trainer Stuart Mason had his licence removed and is fined £1,500 by the Greyhound Board of Great Britain following three cases of positive tests for amphetamine.

Roll of honour

Principal UK finals

	

 * dead-heat
+ track record

Principal Irish finals

References 

Greyhound racing in the United Kingdom
Greyhound racing in the Republic of Ireland
2013 in British sport
2013 in Irish sport